Alego Constituency is an electoral constituency in Kenya. It is one of six constituencies of Siaya County. The constituency was established for the 1963 national elections. It is also known as Alego-Usonga Constituency. The constituency has 13 wards, of which five elect councillors for the urban Siaya municipality and the rest seven for the rural Siaya County Council.

Members of Parliament

Wards

References 

Constituencies in Siaya County
Constituencies in Nyanza Province
1963 establishments in Kenya
Constituencies established in 1963